Thailand participated in the 2010 Asian Games in Guangzhou, China between 12–27 November 2010. The National Olympic Committee of Thailand sent 593 athletes to Guangzhou (280 men and 313 women), and competed in 39 out of 42 sports. Thailand ended the games at 52 overall medals including 11 gold medals. These games witnessed first ever gold medals in Taekwondo.

Medal summary

Medals by sport

Medalists

The following Thai competitors won medals at the games; all dates are for November 2010.

| width="78%" align="left" valign="top" |

| width="22%" align="left" valign="top" |

Aquatics

Swimming

Men

Women

Synchronized swimming

Archery

Men

Women

Athletics

Badminton

Men

Women

Baseball

Preliminary – Group A

November 13, 2010 — 12:00

November 15, 2010 — 13:00

November 16, 2010 — 18:00

Semifinals – Did not advance

Basketball

Women

Preliminary – Group A

5th Place Match

Final Rank – 5th

Board games

Weiqi

Bowling

Boxing

Canoeing

Cricket

Women

Preliminary – Pool C

Preliminary – Pool G

Quarterfinals

Semifinals – Did not advance

Cue sports

Cycling

Dance sports

Dragon boat

Men

Women

Equestrian

Fencing

Football

Men

Round of 16

Quarterfinals

Semifinals – Did not advance

Women

Semifinals – Did not advance

Golf

Men

Women

Gymnastics

Handball

Women

7th Place Match

Final Rank – 7th

Hockey

Women's tournament

5th Place Match

Final Rank – 6th

Judo

Kabaddi

Women

Preliminary – Group A

Semifinals

Gold Medal Match

Final Rank –

Karate

Men

Women

Roller sports

Rowing

Rugby

Men

Quarterfinals

Placement for 5th – 8th

7th Place Match

Final Rank – 8th

Women

Quarterfinals

Semifinals

Bronze Medal Match

Final Rank –

Sailing

Men

Women

Open

Sepak takraw

Men's Regu

Round Robin

Final Rank – 

Men's Team

Preliminary – Group A 

Semifinals

Gold Medal Match

Final Rank – 

Women's Regu

Round Robin

Final Rank – 

Women's Team

Preliminary – Group B 

Semifinals

Gold Medal Match

Final Rank –

Shooting

Men

Women

Softball

Preliminary

November 19, 2010 — 13:00

November 20, 2010 — 15:30

November 21, 2010 — 18:00

November 22, 2010 — 15:30

November 23, 2010 — 18:00

Semifinals – Did not advance

Table tennis

Women

Preliminary – Group C

Quarterfinals

Semifinals – Did not advance

Taekwondo

Men

Women

Tennis

Volleyball

Beach volleyball

Men

Women

Indoor

Men's Tournament

Team roster

Preliminary Round – Group A

|}

Placement for Quarterfinalists – Group E

|}

Quarterfinals

Semifinals

Bronze Medal Match

Final Rank – 4th

Women's Tournament

Team roster

Preliminary Round – Group A

|}

Quarterfinals

Placement for 5th – 8th

5th Place Match

Final Rank – 5th

Weightlifting

Wrestling

Wushu

References

Nations at the 2010 Asian Games
2010
Asian Games